Yoon Shin-Young  (Hangul: 윤신영; born 22 May 1987) is a South Korean football player who plays as a defender for Daejeon Citizen.

Club career 
Yoon was selected by Daejeon Citizen as a draft player for the 2009 K-League season.  After the season was completed, he moved to Sangju Sangmu Phoenix (formerly Gwangju Sangmu FC), the sports division of the Military of South Korea, in order to fulfill his compulsory two-year military service.  Yoon had limited appearances for his new club during the 2010 K-League season, but saw more regular game time in 2011.

Having completed his two-year stint with Sangju, Yoon returned to Daejeon on 21 September 2011. After the 2011 campaign, Yoon left Daejeon as a free agent and joined Gyeongnam FC in January 2012.

On 7 February 2014, Yoon transferred to Chinese Super League side Jiangsu Sainty.

On 20 January 2015, Yoon transferred to K-League side Daejeon Citizen.

On 1 February 2016, Yoon transferred to J2 League side Renofa Yamaguchi FC.

Club career statistics

References

External links 

1987 births
Living people
Association football defenders
South Korean footballers
South Korean expatriate footballers
Daejeon Hana Citizen FC players
Gimcheon Sangmu FC players
Gyeongnam FC players
Renofa Yamaguchi FC players
K League 1 players
K League 2 players
Chinese Super League players
Jiangsu F.C. players
Expatriate footballers in China
South Korean expatriate sportspeople in China
J2 League players